Hong slipinskii is a species of beetle in the genus Hong which is known from specimens collected from Chile, the specific epithet honours Andrew Ślipiński, the authority for genus Hong.

See also

 Hong

References 

Coccinellidae
Insects described in 2013
Insects of South America